Navaraj Rawat (also Nawaraj, Nawraj or Navraj) is a Nepali communist politician and a member of the House of Representatives of the federal parliament of Nepal. He also served as State Minister of Ministry of Health and Population. He was elected from Surkhet-2 constituency representing CPN UML, defeating Hridaya Ram Thani of Nepali Congress by more than 8000 votes. He is the current State Minister of Ministry of Health and Population .

References

Living people
Place of birth missing (living people)
21st-century Nepalese people
People from Surkhet District
Nepal Communist Party (NCP) politicians
Communist Party of Nepal (Unified Marxist–Leninist) politicians
Nepal MPs 2017–2022
1964 births